Radlek (in older sources Radljak) is a small settlement west of Velike Bloke in the Municipality of Bloke in the Inner Carniola region of Slovenia.

Castle
The ruins of Šteberk Castle are located approximately 4 kilometers to the south of Radlek.

References

External links
Radlek on Geopedia

Populated places in the Municipality of Bloke